Qin Xianglian is a fictional Chinese character.

Qin Xianglian could also mean:
 The Story of Ching Hsiang-lien, a 1967 Hong Kong Huangmei opera film, starring Li Lihua as Qin Xianglian (Ching Hsiang-lien).
Qin Xianglian (TV series), a 2011 Chinese TV series starring Mabel Yuan as Qin Xianglian.